Ringeren was a Norwegian weekly political magazine which existed between 1898 and 1899. The magazine was founded by Sigurd Ibsen and was headquartered in Kristiania, Norway.

History and profile
Ringeren was established as a weekly magazine by Sigurd Ibsen in Kristiania. A test issue appeared on 27 November 1897. Its first issue was published on 1 January 1898. The magazine covered articles about politics, culture, literature and criticism and was edited by Ibsen in 1898. Its contributors included Bjørnstjerne Bjørnson, Knut Hamsun, Fridtjof Nansen, Ernst Sars and Arne Garborg. Sigurd Ibsen published articles in Ringeren supporting the continuation of monarchy in Norway but the termination of the Union with Sweden. J. Laurence Hare argues that Ibsen's writings had significant effects on the dynamics of the ongoing debate over the Union by proposing the monarchy as the solution to both the foreign and domestic obstacles to independence of Norway.

Carl Naerup took over the magazine shortly before it folded in 1899.

References

1897 establishments in Norway
1899 disestablishments in Norway
Defunct magazines published in Norway
Magazines established in 1897
Magazines disestablished in 1899
Magazines published in Oslo
Norwegian-language magazines
Weekly magazines published in Norway
Political magazines published in Norway
Defunct political magazines